Alessandro Bastrini (born 3 April 1987) is an Italian footballer who plays as a defender.

Club career

Sampdoria 
Bastrini joined Sampdoria on loan from Como in January 2006, and made his Serie A debut against A.S. Livorno Calcio on 7 May 2006. He was successively sent out on loan to Serie B side Modena in January 2008. In July 2008 he accepted a loan move to Sassuolo, another Serie B team.

In August 2009, he was loaned to Salernitana.

Vicenza
On 9 August 2010 Bastrini was sold to Vicenza Calcio in a co-ownership deal. In June 2011 the deal was renewed. In June 2012 Bastrini and Mattia Mustacchio joined Vicenza outright.

Novara
On 20 August 2012 Bastrini joined Novara Calcio, with Achille Coser moved to opposite direction. Bastrini signed a 4-year contract. On 1 February 2014, Bastrini joined Serie A side Cagliari on loan for the remainder of 2013–14 season. On 17 July 2014 Bastrini was signed by Ternana in a temporary deal, with an option to buy.

Catania
On 28 August 2015 Bastrini was signed by Calcio Catania in a temporary deal, with an obligation to sign outright at the end of season. He signed a 1+2-year contract.

Cremonese
On 18 January 2017 Bastrini was signed by Cremonese.

Monopoli
On 31 January 2019, he signed with Monopoli.

Lecco
On 20 September 2019 he joined Lecco.

Return to Monopoli
On 29 September 2020, he returned to Monopoli on a one-year contract. He was released from his contract on 1 February 2021.

International career
On 5 October 2007 was called up for the first time by Pierluigi Casiraghi for the Italy U-21's in the matches against Croatia and Greece in the qualification for the European Championships in Sweden, however Bastrini was unused in both matches.

References

External links
 
 

1987 births
People from Domodossola
Footballers from Piedmont
Living people
Italian footballers
Association football defenders
Como 1907 players
U.C. Sampdoria players
Modena F.C. players
U.S. Sassuolo Calcio players
U.S. Salernitana 1919 players
L.R. Vicenza players
Novara F.C. players
Cagliari Calcio players
Ternana Calcio players
Catania S.S.D. players
U.S. Cremonese players
A.C. Reggiana 1919 players
S.S. Monopoli 1966 players
Calcio Lecco 1912 players
Serie A players
Serie B players
Serie C players
Sportspeople from the Province of Verbano-Cusio-Ossola